Tapash Mandal (born 26 December 1997) is an Indian cricketer who plays for Tripura. He made his first-class debut on 30 October in the 2015–16 Ranji Trophy.

References

External links
 

1997 births
Living people
Indian cricketers
Tripura cricketers
Cricketers from Tripura
People from Sipahijala district